The Midnite Hour is a dance album by American house artist Jamie Principle, released in January 1992 on the label Smash Records. The album is a mixture of electronic, dance and soul music, produced by Steve "Silk" Hurley and Jamie Principle. The album was reissued in November 2012 by Island Records.

Track listing

Personnel
Credits taken from album liner notes

Arranged By, Engineer – Steve "Silk" Hurley
Lead Vocals, Backing Vocals, Written-By, Producer, Arranged By, Engineer – Jamie Principle
Backing vocals [additional] Kim Sims (track:6), Dave Jackson, Manny Mohr, Martell Stewart (track: 7), Chantay Savage, Donell Rush (track: 8)
Drum Programming – Jamie Principle (tracks: 1, 2, 9, 10), Steve "Silk" Hurley (tracks: 1 to 4, 6 to 8)
Engineer – Eric Miller, Larry Sturm
Keyboards – Jamie Principle (tracks: 1 to 4, 8 to 10), Steve "Silk" Hurley (tracks: 1 to 4, 6 to 8, 10), Eric Miller (track: 5)
Executive Producer – Connie Varvitsiotis, Frank Rodrigo
Producer, Mixed By – Steve "Silk" Hurley (tracks: 1 to 4, 6 to 10)
Written-By – Steve "Silk" Hurley (tracks: 2 to 4, 6, 7)

References

External links
jamieprinciple.com
Jamie Principle Official myspace page
Jamie Principle|Facebook page

1992 debut albums
Smash Records albums